In the Aisles of the Wild is a 1912 American drama film directed by  D. W. Griffith.

Cast
 Lillian Gish as The Younger Daughter
 Claire McDowell as The Elder Daughter
 William J. Butler as The Widower
 Henry B. Walthall as Jim Watson
 Harry Carey as Bob Cole
 Elmer Booth as A Woodsman
 Charles Hill Mailes as A Woodsman
 Alfred Paget as An Indian

See also
 Harry Carey filmography
 D. W. Griffith filmography
 Lillian Gish filmography

References

External links

1912 films
Films directed by D. W. Griffith
1912 short films
American silent short films
American black-and-white films
1912 drama films
Silent American drama films
Films with screenplays by Stanner E.V. Taylor
1910s American films